Olivella santacruzence is a species of small sea snail, marine gastropod mollusk in the subfamily Olivellinae, in the family Olividae, the olives.  Species in the genus Olivella are commonly called dwarf olives.

Description
The shell grows to a length of 4.5 mm.

Distribution
This species occurs in the Atlantic Ocean from Southern Brazil to Southern Argentina.

References

santacruzence
Gastropods described in 1965